Upper Fairmount is an unincorporated community in Somerset County, Maryland, United States.  It is located at the intersection of Maryland Route 361 (Fairmount Road) and Upper Hill Road. The Academy Grove Historic District, Maddux House, Schoolridge Farm, Tudor Hall, and Upper Fairmount Historic District are listed on the National Register of Historic Places.

References

Unincorporated communities in Somerset County, Maryland
Unincorporated communities in Maryland
Maryland populated places on the Chesapeake Bay